The 1991 Victorian Football Association season was the 110th season of the Australian rules football competition. The premiership was won by the Dandenong Football Club, after it defeated Werribee in the grand final on 22 September by nine points; it was Dandenong's third and final top-division premiership, won only two years after the club finished second-last with one win.

Association membership
Two clubs withdrew from the Association in 1991: Camberwell, which withdrew shortly before the start of the season; and Brunswick-Broadmeadows, which withdrew after playing three matches. As a result, the playing membership of the Association was reduced to twelve, the fewest since 1950.

Withdrawal of Camberwell
The Camberwell Football Club had been in a weak on-field and off-field position since 1985. It had managed to maintain a reasonable team at Division 2 level until 1988; but, after the second division was abandoned at the start of 1989, it had been unable to compile a playing list which was competitive against the former Division 1 clubs, and had consequently endured two consecutive winless seasons. The club intended to compete in the 1991 VFA season and made full preparations to do so; however, after suffering a twelve-goal loss in a pre-season match against Bendigo Football League club South Bendigo during March, the club recognised that its playing list was even less competitive than its 1990 list. On 24 March, coach Gary Brice decided to walk out on the club rather than face another futile season; and within a week, the club announced its withdrawal from the 1991 season, stating that it would be better to attempt to consolidate its position and attempt to return for the 1992 season, rather than further ruin both its own reputation and the reputation of the Association by fielding an uncompetitive team. The club never managed to return to the Association; it played in the Victorian Amateur Football Association from 1992 until 1994 before folding.

Withdrawal and folding of Brunswick-Broadmeadows
The financially struggling Brunswick Football Club had merged with the Broadmeadows Football Club in October 1989 in the hope of establishing a plan for future viability. However, throughout the 1990 season, fighting between Brunswick and Broadmeadows factions of the board had hindered the club's efforts to improve its situation, prompting the Association to sack the club's board in August 1990 and appoint an administrator. When the club was returned to a new board in September, it was still more than $250,000 in debt and at risk of Broadmeadows withdrawing from the merger; the Association recommended the club withdraw and join a suburban league, but it pressed on with preparations for the 1991 VFA season.

The club tried to raise funds over the summer to clear its debts, but had too few fans and too few administrators; as a result it was left unable to make its match payments to players for the 1990 season, resulting in an exodus of most of its senior players. The inexperienced team which remained suffered three huge losses to begin the 1991 season – including a 250-point loss to eventual premiers Dandenong and a 97-point loss to eventual wooden-spooners Oakleigh – and announced its withdrawal from the season on 6 May 1991. Like Camberwell, Brunswick-Broadmeadows remained a non-playing member of the Association with the hope of consolidating its position and returning to playing in 1992, but this never happened, with the club folding soon after. The three games that the club had played were expunged from the VFA's records, and the rest of the fixture was redrawn to ensure all teams played an equal number of games.

Premiership season
In the home-and-away season, each team played eighteen games; the top five then contested the finals under the McIntyre final five system. The primary finals venue was North Port Oval, and the grand final was played at Princes Park.

Ladder

Finals

Grand final
The 1991 Grand Final was a see-sawing contest with a close finish. After Werribee scored the first goal of the game, Dandenong scored the next four. Werribee then scored eight of the next nine goals, and kept Dandenong goalless in the second quarter, to hold a 30-point lead early in the third quarter. Dandenong scored the next five goals to reduce the margin, and took a 5-point lead into three quarter time.

The final quarter is remembered for key events which swung the game in Dandenong's favour when scores were close late in the game: after 15 minutes of play, Werribee's Phil O'Keeffe was ordered off the ground for assaulting Dandenong's Ian Atkinson, resulting in a five-minute delay while Atkinson was stretchered from the ground, and a resulting free kick to Dandenong from which it scored a goal which put it six points in front – Atkinson's jaw was broken in three places, and O'Keeffe was suspended for six weeks for the assault. Werribee regained a one-point lead after 22 minutes from a Nick Walsh free kick, and Rohan Welsh regained the five-point lead for Dandenong a minute later. Werribee attacked over the next few minutes, and missed two short-range snap shots – the first by Stephen Sells, and the second a shot by Werribee captain-coach Leon Harris which was touched on the line in a diving save by Dandenong captain-coach Tony Elshaug – to reduce the margin to three points after 26 minutes. Werribee continued to attack over the following two minutes, before Dandenong rebounded and Sean Millane kicked the sealing goal in the 29th minute.

Awards
The leading goalkicker for the home-and-away season was Frank Rugolo (Sandringham), who kicked 78 goals and did not participate in finals. For the whole season including finals, the leading goalkicker was Rohan Welsh (Dandenong), who kicked 69 goals in the home-and-away season and 84 goals overall.
The J. J. Liston Trophy was won by Anthony Eames (Werribee), who polled 22 votes. Eames finished ahead of Robert Bolzon (Prahran), who was second with 21 votes, and Joe Rugolo (Sandringham) and Simon Dalrymple (Box Hill), who were equal third with 14 votes.
The Fothergill-Round Medal was won by Ron De Iulio (Box Hill).
Prahran won the seconds premiership. Prahran 11.16 (82) defeated Coburg 10.12 (72) in the grand final, held as a curtain-raiser to the Seniors Grand Final on 22 September.

Notable events
In the second semi-final, Werribee recorded its first ever finals win in either division since joining the Association in 1965, after having lost all seven of the previous finals it had contested. Even so, the win was unconvincing, winning by twelve points despite recording thirteen fewer scoring shots.

See also
List of VFA/VFL Premiers
 Australian Rules Football
 Victorian Football League

References

Victorian Football League seasons
VFL